Brian O'Brian is an Italian-American series of television shorts airing on Disney Channel. The series is co-written and directed by Danny Kaplan and stars Brian Stepanek, who also co-writes; original score by Stuart Balcomb, and produced in Cologno Monzese near Milan, Italy. Individual episodes are quick comedy sketches, 2–4 minutes in length. Much like almost all of Disney's modern-day television comedy programming, the show uses a laugh track. The main character Brian is inspired by the physical comedy of such silent-screen greats as Charlie Chaplin and Buster Keaton.

An ad promoting the premiere of Brian O'Brian was shown during the premiere of The Suite Life on Deck on September 26, 2008, on Disney Channel, and the series premiered on October 3, 2008. In Latin America, it premiered on February 16, 2009 on Disney Channel Latin America. The season started on September 16, 2008 on Disney Channel Italy.

Episodes

See also 
 The Coppertop Flop Show
 Mr. Bean

References

External links 
Official Site 

Disney Channel original programming
Cologno Monzese
Italian comedy television series
2000s American comedy television series
2008 American television series debuts
2008 American television series endings
English-language television shows